The Joker's Jinx is a steel roller coaster at Six Flags America in Prince George's County, Maryland.

The Joker's Jinx was designed by Premier Rides and manufactured by Intermountain Lift, Inc.

History
In the fall of 1998, pieces of green Premier Rides roller coaster track were spotted on the park's property. On October 28, 1998, it was announced that Adventure World would be renamed Six Flags America and feature three new roller coasters, including Joker's Jinx. Joker's Jinx would be an LIM spaghetti bowl launch coaster by Premier Rides. It was to be located in a brand new  Gotham City section, which would be entered by passing under The Wild One roller coaster.

Construction of Joker's Jinx began in December 1998 and was completed in late March 1999. On April 4, 1999, the ride performed its first test runs. Joker's Jinx officially opened on May 8, 1999.

Joker's Jinx was repainted with a brighter green track in 2020.

Ride Layout

Joker's Jinx is located in the Gotham City section of the park near Superman: Ride of Steel roller coaster and Whistlestop Park. After boarding Joker's Jinx, riders are launched through a narrow launch tunnel into a "spaghetti bowl" of track which contains a cobra roll, a sidewinder, and many twists and turns. The coaster doesn't have a mid-course brake run like the similar rides at Kings Island and Kings Dominion; instead the coaster has multiple rings that the train goes through. After the rings, riders spiral downward and to the left, and after more twists and turns they pass through a corkscrew before arriving at the ride's final brake run.

Premier Rides built several of these LIM Catapult roller coasters from 1996 to 1999, although only the two Flight of Fear rides are indoors.  The other outdoor LIM Catapult coaster in the United States is Poltergeist at Six Flags Fiesta Texas; that opened in 1999. In addition, a LIM Catapult coaster called Mad Cobra operated at Suzuka Circuit in Japan from 1998–2003; Mad Cobra was moved to China and reopened at Kingdoms of Discovery in 2006. The five Premier LIM catapult coasters share a similar layout and have the same technical specifications.

Premier Rides gave the trains an overhaul in 2002 and replaced the restraints with lap bars.

Ride Elements
 Cobra Roll
 Sidewinder
 Corkscrew

Awards

Incidents
They were evacuated safely, and there were no reported injuries. The roller coaster was stuck in the same position it was in when a similar incident occurred in 2014, where it took more than four hours to evacuate the stranded riders.

See also 
 Poltergeist, a similar ride at Six Flags Fiesta Texas
 Flight of Fear, similar, but enclosed, rides at Kings Island and Kings Dominion
 Incidents at Six Flags parks

References

External links 
 Joker's Jinx website

Roller coasters operated by Six Flags
Six Flags America
Roller coasters in Maryland
Roller coasters introduced in 1999
Batman in amusement parks
Joker (character) in other media
Warner Bros. Global Brands and Experiences attractions
Gotham City (theme parks)